Oscar Alfredo Ruggeri (born 26 January 1962) is an Argentine former professional footballer who played as centre-back. Nicknamed El Cabezón ("The Big-Headed One"), Ruggeri achieved success at the international level with the Argentina national team, being part of the teams that won the 1986 FIFA World Cup, two editions of the Copa América and the 1992 King Fahd Cup. At the club level, Ruggeri's most successful stint was with Argentine club River Plate, where he won the 1986 Copa Libertadores (also the club's first win in this tournament) the 1986 Copa Interamericana and the 1986 Intercontinental Cup. Known for his rough style of play when marking opposing players and aerial ability, Ruggeri is considered one of the all-time best defenders to come out of Argentina. Following his retirement as a player, Ruggeri turned to managing, where he held posts in Argentina, Mexico and Spain. His last job as a manager was in 2006 with Argentine club San Lorenzo. Since then, Ruggeri went on to have a career on Argentine television, as commentator on football shows. He is currently a member of 90 Minutos de Fútbol, which airs in Fox Sports Latin America.

Career
Ruggeri started his career at Boca Juniors, playing with Diego Maradona, with whom he won a league title in 1981. In 1985, he moved to rivals River Plate, where he won the Copa Libertadores, the Intercontinental Cup and another league title in 1986. In 1988, he left for Europe where he played for Spanish clubs Logroñes and Real Madrid, where he won yet another league championship. He also played for Vélez Sarsfield, Ancona in Italy, América in Mexico, San Lorenzo and Lanús, where he ended his career.

During his career he represented his country in three World Cups, captaining Argentina in the final two games of the 1994 competition, after Diego Maradona was expelled from the tournament. Ruggeri was also a key piece in the Argentina teams that won the trophy in 1986 and lost the final to West-Germany in 1990. After losing to Romania in the 1994 tournament, Ruggeri retired from international football having played 97 international games, an Argentine record until it was surpassed by Diego Simeone.

Personal life
Ruggeri's son, Stephan, is a professional footballer. Ruggeri himself appeared on the 2016 edition of Bailando por un Sueño with his daughter, Candela.

Career statistics

Honours

Club
Boca Juniors
Argentine Primera División: 1981 Metropolitano

River Plate
Argentine Primera División: 1985–86
Copa Libertadores: 1986
Intercontinental Cup: 1986
Copa Interamericana: 1986

Real Madrid
La Liga: 1989–90

América
 CONCACAF Champions' Cup: 1992

San Lorenzo
Argentine Primera División: 1995 Clausura

International
Argentina
FIFA World Cup: 1986; runner-up: 1990
Copa América: 1991, 1993
FIFA Confederations Cup: 1992
Kirin Cup: 1992

Individual
South American Team of the Year: 1986, 1991
La Liga Foreign Player of the Year: 1989
Footballer of the Year of Argentina: 1991
South American Footballer of the Year: 1991
Olimpia Award: 1991
FIFA XI: 1991

References

External links
Sports Illustrated on Ruggeri
Ruggeri's Player statistics 
Oscar Ruggeri – Managerial statistics in the Argentine Primera at Fútbol XXI  
 

1962 births
Living people
Argentine footballers
Boca Juniors footballers
Club América footballers
Club Atlético River Plate footballers
A.C. Ancona players
Serie A players
Club Atlético Vélez Sarsfield footballers
San Lorenzo de Almagro footballers
La Liga players
Real Madrid CF players
CD Logroñés footballers
Argentine expatriate footballers
Argentine expatriate sportspeople in Spain
Expatriate footballers in Italy
Expatriate footballers in Spain
Expatriate footballers in Mexico
Copa Libertadores-winning players
FIFA Confederations Cup-winning players
FIFA World Cup-winning players
Argentina international footballers
1986 FIFA World Cup players
1987 Copa América players
1989 Copa América players
1990 FIFA World Cup players
1991 Copa América players
1992 King Fahd Cup players
1993 Copa América players
1994 FIFA World Cup players
Sportspeople from Córdoba Province, Argentina
Argentine football managers
San Lorenzo de Almagro managers
Club Atlético Independiente managers
Club América managers
C.D. Guadalajara managers
Tecos F.C. managers
Elche CF managers
Argentine Primera División players
Liga MX players
Argentine people of Italian descent
Expatriate football managers in Mexico
Expatriate football managers in Spain
South American Footballer of the Year winners
Copa América-winning players
Association football defenders
Participants in Argentine reality television series
Bailando por un Sueño (Argentine TV series) participants